Ytterbium(III) chloride (YbCl3) is an inorganic chemical compound. It reacts with NiCl2 to form a very effective catalyst for the reductive dehalogenation of aryl halides. It is poisonous if injected, and mildly toxic by ingestion. It is an experimental teratogen, known to irritate the skin and eyes. When heated to decomposition it emits toxic fumes of Cl−.

History
The synthesis of YbCl3 was first reported by Jan Hoogschagen in 1946. It is now a commercially available source of Yb3+ ions and therefore of significant chemical interest.

Chemical properties
The valence electron configuration of Yb+3 (from YbCl3) is 4f135s25p6, which has crucial implications for the chemical behaviour of Yb+3. Also, the size of Yb+3 governs its catalytic behaviour and biological applications. For example, while both Ce+3 and Yb+3 have a single unpaired f electron, Ce+3 is much larger than Yb+3 because lanthanides become much smaller with increasing effective nuclear charge as a consequence of the f electrons not being as well shielded as d electrons. This behavior is known as the lanthanide contraction. The small size of Yb+3 produces fast catalytic behavior and an atomic radius (0.99 Å) comparable to many biologically important ions.

The gas-phase thermodynamic properties of this chemical are difficult to determine because the chemical can disproportionate to form [YbCl6]−3 or dimerize. The Yb2Cl6 species was detected by electron impact (EI) mass spectrometry as (Yb2Cl5+). Additional complications in obtaining experimental data arise from the myriad of low-lying f-d and f-f electronic transitions. Despite these issues, the thermodynamic properties of YbCl3 have been obtained and the C3V symmetry group has been assigned based upon the four active infrared vibrations.

Preparation
Anhydrous ytterbium(III) chloride can be produced by the ammonium chloride route.  In the first step, ytterbium oxide is heated with ammonium chloride to produce the ammonium salt of the pentachloride:
Yb2O3  +  10NH4Cl  →   2(NH4)2YbCl5  +  6H2O  +  6NH3
In the second step, the ammonium chloride salt is converted to the trichlorides by heating in a vacuum at 350-400 °C:
(NH4)2YbCl5 →   YbCl3  +  2HCl  +  2NH3

Reactions
YbCl3 is a paramagnetic  Lewis acid, like many of the lanthanide chlorides.   It gives rise to pseudocontact shifted NMR spectra, akin to NMR shift reagents

Applications in biology
Membrane biology has been greatly influenced by YbCl3, where39K+ and23Na+ ion movement is critical in establishing electrochemical gradients. Nerve signaling is a fundamental aspect of life that may be probed with YbCl3 using NMR
techniques. YbCl3 may also be used as a calcium ion probe, in a fashion similar
to a sodium ion probe.

YbCl3 is also used to track digestion in animals. Certain additives to swine feed, such as probiotics, may be added to either solid feed or drinking liquids. YbCl3 travels
with the solid food and therefore helps determine which food phase is ideal to incorporate the food additive. The YbCl3 concentration is quantified by inductively coupled plasma mass spectrometry to within 0.0009 μg/mL. YbCl3 concentration versus time yields the flow rate of solid particulates in the animal's digestion. The animal is not harmed by the YbCl3 since YbCl3 is simply excreted in fecal matter and no change in body weight, organ weight, or hematocrit levels has been observed in mice.

The catalytic nature of YbCl3 also has an application in DNA microarrays, or so called DNA “chips”. YbCl3 led to a 50–80 fold increase in fluorescein incorporation into target DNA, which could revolutionize infectious disease detection (such as a rapid test for tuberculosis).

References

Chlorides
Lanthanide halides
Ytterbium compounds
Catalysts